Forbidden Women also known as Tictaban l'isola dell'amore proibito is a 1948 Philippine adventure film directed by Eduardo de Castro. It stars Fernando Poe, Berting Labra, Mona Lisa.

Cast
Fernando Poe - Prince Singor
Berting Labra - The Sultan
Mona Lisa - Princess Apamena
Fernando Royo - 
Luningning -
Bimbo Danao -

References

External links
 Forbidden Women at IMDb.com

 Tictaban, Italian titled poster

1948 films
Philippine black-and-white films
Philippine adventure films
1948 adventure films